Shaghayegh Farahani (born ) is an Iranian actress. She is the daughter of actor Behzad Farahani, and sister of actress Golshifteh Farahani.

Early life 
Farahani was born Tehran, Iran. She is the oldest daughter of veteran Iranian actor Behzad Farahani and stage actress Fahimeh Rahiminia. Her sister is actress Golshifteh Farahani.

Career
Some of her other works include Tootia (1998), Cinderella (2001), Butterfly in the Wind (2003), Charlatan (2004), The Trial (2006), Bahareh in the Rain (2008), The Sinners (2012), Metropol (2013) and Resurrection Day (Hussein Who Said No) (2014).

She has appeared in a few TV productions, including The Pahlavi Hat (2012–2013), Matador (2013), Motherly (2013), A Beautiful Revolution (2014).

Personal life
She was married, and divorced some years later. She became the mother of a son named Sam at the age of 20.

Selected filmography
 Leila, 1996
 Love is not Enough, 1998
 The Pear Tree, 1998
 Tootia, 1998
 Nights of Tehran, 1999
 An Umbrella for Two, 2001
 Butterfly in the Wind, 2004
 Sharlatan, 2005
 The Guest, 2006
 Bahareh in the Rain, 2008
 Metropol, 2013 
 Conditional Release, 2016
 My Second Year in College, 2019
 Angel Street Bride, 2021

References

External links

1972 births
Living people
People from Tehran
Actresses from Tehran
Iranian film actresses
Iranian television actresses
20th-century Iranian actresses
21st-century Iranian actresses
Islamic Azad University alumni